Curcurorjo (possibly from Quechua k'urkur Chusquea scandens, urqu mountain, "k'urkur mountain") is a mountain in the Andes of Peru, about  high. It is located in the Cusco Region, La Convención Province, Huayopata District, and in the Urubamba Province, Machupicchu District. Curcurorjo lies in the northwestern extensions of the Urubamba mountain range, northeast of the archaeological site of Machu Picchu.

References

Mountains of Peru
Mountains of Cusco Region